The POW–MIA Memorial is installed on the Washington State Capitol campus in Olympia, Washington, United States. The marble and granite memorial was originally dedicated as the Vietnam Veterans Memorial on November 11, 1982, and later rededicated to commemorate prisoners of war (POW) and people missing in action (MIA) on September 16, 1988 (National POW/MIA Recognition Day).

References

Monuments and memorials in Olympia, Washington
Washington State Capitol campus